Filip Bačkulja (born 25 June 2002) is a Serbian footballer who plays as a centre-back for Metalac on loan from Juniors OÖ.

International career
Bačkulja debut for Serbia U21 national team was on 6 June 2021 in a friendly match against Russia U21.

References

External links
 
 
 

2002 births
Living people
Association football defenders
Serbian footballers
FC Juniors OÖ players
FK Brodarac players
FK Metalac Gornji Milanovac players
Serbian SuperLiga players
2. Liga (Austria) players
Sportspeople from Kraljevo
Serbia under-21 international footballers
Serbian expatriate footballers
Serbian expatriate sportspeople in Austria
Expatriate footballers in Austria